Leonardo Martín Migliónico (born 31 January 1980) is a Uruguayan footballer who plays as a defender for 3 de Febrero.

Club career
Migliónico's previous clubs include JJ Urquiza and Estudiantes (Buenos Aires).

He joined Sampdoria in January 2008 in a joint-ownership bid, where he met with former teammate Hugo Campagnaro.

He made his Serie A debut on 24 February 2008 in a 1–1 draw with Internazionale, and made three more first team appearances during the remainder of the season.

In July 2008 he was loaned out to Serie B side Livorno.

On 27 January 2012, Migliónico signed with Serie A side Lecce along with Manuele Blasi and Haris Seferovic.

References

External links
 
 Leonardo Migliónico at BDFA.com.ar 
 

1980 births
Living people
Footballers from Montevideo
Uruguayan footballers
Association football midfielders
Uruguayan Primera División players
Serie A players
Serie B players
Uruguayan expatriate footballers
Uruguayan expatriate sportspeople in Argentina
Uruguayan expatriate sportspeople in Italy
Expatriate footballers in Argentina
Expatriate footballers in Italy
Expatriate footballers in Paraguay
Piacenza Calcio 1919 players
U.C. Sampdoria players
U.S. Livorno 1915 players
U.S. Lecce players
Racing Club de Avellaneda footballers
Club Atlético 3 de Febrero players